Akhbrak (also, Akhpyurak and Agpara) is a town in the Kotayk Province of Armenia.

See also 
Kotayk Province

References 

Populated places in Kotayk Province